Magnetic navigation can be performed using:
 Compass (by humans)
 Magnetoreception (by certain animals)